Bosara is a genus of moths in the family Geometridae.

Species
Bosara agassizi Galsworthy, 2002
Bosara albitornalis (L. B. Prout, 1958)
Bosara atypha (Prout, 1958)
Bosara brevipecten Holloway, 1997
Bosara bursacristata Holloway, 1997
Bosara bursalobata Holloway, 1997
Bosara callinda (Holloway, 1979)
Bosara catabares (Prout, 1958)
Bosara cuneativenis (Prout, 1958)
Bosara dilatata Walker, 1866
Bosara emarginaria (Hampson, 1893)
Bosara epilopha (Turner, 1907)
Bosara errabunda (L. B. Prout, 1958)
Bosara exortiva (L. B. Prout, 1958)
Bosara festivata (Warren, 1903)
Bosara janae Galsworthy, 1999
Bosara kadooriensis Galsworthy, 2002
Bosara linda (Robinson, 1975)
Bosara longipecten Holloway, 1997
Bosara maculilinea (Warren, 1898)
Bosara maior Galsworthy, 2002
Bosara minima (Warren, 1897)
Bosara modesta (Warren, 1893)
Bosara montana Orhant, 2003
Bosara phoenicophaes (Prout, 1958)
Bosara pygmaeica (Prout, 1958)
Bosara reductata Holloway, 1997
Bosara refusaria (Walker, 1861)
Bosara subrobusta (Inoue, 1988)
Bosara torquibursa Galsworthy, 2002

References

 , 1999: New and revised eupitheciine species (Geometridae, Larentiinae) from Hong Kong and South East Asia. Transactions of the Lepidopterological Society of Japan 50(3): 223-234. Abstract and full article: .
 , 2002: Bosara Walker: revisional notes on the Bosara refusaria group of species (Geometridae: Larentiinae). Transactions of the Lepidopterological Society of Japan 54 (3): 147-155.
 , 2003: Deuxième contribution à la connaissance des Lépidoptères Hétérocères de Tahiti avec quelques données pour Moorea. Bulletin de la Société Entomologique de Mulhouse 59 (2): 22-33.

Eupitheciini
Moth genera